This is a list of Brazilian-produced television series and television programs.



0–9
1 Contra Todos (2016),  drama
220 Volts (2011),  comedy
3% (2016),  drama/science fiction
9mm: São Paulo (2008),  action/police drama

A
A Confeitaria (2012), cooking
Adnet ao Vivo (2011), talk
Agora É Tarde (2011), talk
A Escolinha do Golias (1990), comedy
A Fazenda (2009), reality
A Floricultura da Nana (2008), children
A Grande Família (2001), sitcom
A Grande Música (2001), music
A Lei e o Crime (2009), drama
A Liga (2010), documentary
A Praça é Nossa (1987), comedy
Alice (2008), drama
As Brasileiras (2012), comedy

B
Batendo Ponto (2011), comedy
Beija Sapo (2005), game show
Beijo, Me liga (2009), comedy-drama
Bem Estar (2011), variety
Bicicleta e Melancia (2010), comedy-drama
Big Brother Brasil (2002), reality
Bom Dia e Companhia (1993), children
Borges Importadora (2018), sitcom
Brasil no Prato (2012), cooking
Brazil's Next Top Model (2007), reality/ talent competition
Busão do Brasil (2010), reality

C
A Cabana do Pai Tomás, telenovela
Caminho das Índias, telenovela
Caminhos do Coração, telenovela
Canal Livre (1989), crime drama
Castelo Rá-Tim-Bum (1994), children
Carrossel (2012), telenovela
Carrossel Animado (2007), children
Cilada (2005), sitcom
City of Men (2002), drama
Cocoricó (1996), children
Coisa Mais Linda (2019), drama
Cozinha Caseira (2011), cooking
Como Aproveitar o Fim do Mundo (2012), drama
Confissões de Adolescente (1994), drama
Custe o Que Custar (2008), news/comedy

D
Dança dos Famosos (2005), reality
De Cara Limpa (2010), comedy
Detetives do Prédio Azul (2012), children
Destino: São Paulo (2012), drama
Donas de Casa Desesperadas (2007), comedy-drama

E
Escola pra Cachorro (2009), animated

F
Família Rocha (2010), sitcom
Faith Show (1997), religion/talk
Fazenda de Verão (2012), reality
Fishtronaut (2009), animated 
Fora de Controle (2012), police drama
Força-Tarefa (2009), drama/thriller
Fudêncio e Seus Amigos (2005), animated sitcom
Furfles MTV (2009), sitcom
Furo MTV (2009), comedy
Furia MTV (1990), music

G
Gamebros (2018), Crime drama
Geleia do Rock (2009), reality/talent
Gigantes do Brasil (2016), biography
Globo Repórter (1973), documentary

H
Haunted Tales for Wicked Kids (2013), animated comedy
Hermes & Renato (1999), comedy
High School Musical: A Seleção (2008), reality/talent
Hipertensão (2002), reality
Homens Gourmet (2012), cooking

I
Ídolos Brazil (2009), reality/talent
Impuros (2018), crime drama

J
Jorel's Brother (2014), animated comedy
Jovem Guarda (1965), music
Julie and the Phantoms (2011), musical drama

L
Linha Direta (1999), news/reality
Louca Família (2007), sitcom
Louco por Elas (2012), sitcom

M
Mandrake (2005), comedy-drama
Magnifica 70 (2015), drama
O Mecanismo (2018), political drama
Me Chama de Bruna (2016), drama
Mil Dias: A Saga da Construção de Brasília (2018), documentary/drama
Monica's Gang (1980-2006, 2012–present) animated comedy
Morando Sozinho (2010), comedy
Mulheres Ricas (2012), reality show

N
Na Fama e Na Lama (2010), comedy-drama
Newbie and the Disasternauts (2010), animated comedy
No Limite (2000), reality

O
O Brasil É aqui, variety
O Fantástico Mundo de Gregório (2012), comedy-drama
Olívias na TV (2011), comedy
Open Bar (2010), comedy
O Quinto dos Infernos (2002), comedy
Os Aspones (2004), comedy
Oscar Freire 279 (2011), drama
Osmar - A Primeira Fatia do Pão de Forma'''' (2013), animated comedyOs Anjos do Sexo (2011), sitcomOs Caras de Pau (2006), comedyOs Normais (2001), sitcomOs Trapalhões (1977), comedyO Caminho Antigo, religious

PPânico na Band (2012), comedyPânico na TV (2003), comedyPico da Neblina (2019), dramaPixcodelics (2005), animatedPopstar (2002), reality/talentPor Um Fio (2010), realityPreamar (2012), comedy/dramaPsi (2014), dramaPrograma da Palmirinha (2012), varietyPrograma do Jô (2000), comedy/talk

QQual é o Seu Talento? (2009), talentQue Mundo é Esse? (2015), travel documentaryQuinta Categoria (2008), comedy

RRei Davi (2012), historical dramaRockgol (1995), sportsRonaldinho Gaucho's Team (2011), animatedRua Augusta (2018), drama

SSábado Animado, childrenSansão e Dalila (2011), historical dramaSai de Baixo (1996), sitcomSe Ela Dança, Eu Danço (2011), talentSem Controle (2007), sitcomShow do Tom (2004), comedy/talkSítio do Picapau Amarelo (2012), animatedSupermax (2016), Horror/Action

TTamanho Família (1985), sitcomTapas & Beijos (2011), comedyThe Amazing Race: A Corrida Milionária (2007), reality/game showThe Nadas (2005), sitcomThe Chosen One (2019), thrillerThe Strange World of Coffin Joe, talkThe Ultimate Fighter: Brazil (2012), reality/sportsToma Lá, Dá Cá (2007), sitcomTop Model O Reality (2012), realityThe Voice Brasil (2012), reality/talent competitionTudo Simples (2012), varietyTV Colosso (1993), childrenTV Fama (2000), varietyTV Globinho (2000), childrenTV Pirata (1988), comedyTV Xuxa (2005), variety

UUFC sem Limites (2009), sports

VVídeo Show (1983), varietyVocê Decide (1992), thriller mystery

XX-Tudo (1992), children

ZZapping Zone (2001), childrenZé do Caixão  (2015), comedyZorra Total'' (1999), comedy

Lists of television series by country of production
 
Television series